Torcy-le-Petit is a commune in the Seine-Maritime department in the Normandy region in north-western France.

Geography

Heraldry

Population

Places of interest
 The church of St. Denis, dating from the thirteenth century.

See also
Communes of the Seine-Maritime department

References

Communes of Seine-Maritime